The 2018 Vaahteraliiga season was the 39th season of the highest level of American football in Finland. The regular season took place between May 10 and September 9, 2018. The Finnish champion was determined in the playoffs, and at the championship game Vaahteramalja XXXIX the Helsinki Roosters won a league record seventh consecutive championship, this time against the Kuopio Steelers.

Standings

Playoffs

References

American football in Finland
Vaahteraliiga
Vaahteraliiga